Geoff MacIlwain (born 28 October 1963) is a former Australian rules footballer who played with Richmond in the Victorian Football League (VFL).

MacIlwain was already 22 when he first played for Richmond. He made two senior appearances in total for the club, both early in the 1986 VFL season. The former Doncaster player would go on to win back to back Henderson Medals with Maryborough, in 1990 and 1991.

References

1963 births
Australian rules footballers from Victoria (Australia)
Richmond Football Club players
Maryborough Football Club players
Living people